State Route 562 is an expressway in the Cincinnati metro area of southwestern Ohio. It travels east–west between Interstate 75 and Interstate 71, crossing through the suburban enclave of Norwood. It is generally locally referred to as the Norwood Lateral Expressway.

Route description

SR 562, also known as the Norwood Lateral Expressway, begins at an interchange with I-75 in the Bond Hill neighborhood of northern Cincinnati near St. Bernard. The road has an interchange with SR 4 and U.S. Route 42 near Bond Hill.  The route then has an interchange with US 22/SR 3 in Norwood.  Before the eastern terminus at I-71, the road passes under two different railroad tracks.  The eastern terminus of the highway is at a full interchange with I-71.

The entire length of SR 562 in Ohio is included as a part of the National Highway System (NHS).  The NHS is a network of highways that are identified as being most important for the economy, mobility and defense of the nation.

History

The first section of the Norwood Lateral Expressway was opened to traffic on July 15, 1960, connecting the Mill Creek Expressway (I-75) to Reading Road. Construction of next section, between Reading Road and Montgomery Road, began in April 1970 and was completed on December 12, 1972, at a cost of $6.8 million. The final section, linking to the Northeast Expressway (I-71), opened in late 1973.

Major intersections

References

External links

Norwood Lateral Expressway

562
Roads in Cincinnati
Freeways in the United States
Transportation in Hamilton County, Ohio